Group E of the women's football tournament at the 2020 Summer Olympics was played from 21 to 27 July 2021 and included Canada, Chile, Great Britain and hosts Japan. The top two teams, Great Britain and Canada, advanced to the knockout stage, along with third-placed Japan as one of the two best third-placed teams among all three groups.

Teams

Notes

Standings

In the quarter-finals,
The winner of Group E, Great Britain, advanced to play the third-placed team of Group G, Australia.
The runner-up of Group E, Canada, advanced to play the runner-up of Group F, Brazil.
The third-placed team of Group E, Japan, advanced as one of the two best third-placed teams to play the winner of Group G, Sweden.

Matches

Great Britain vs Chile

Japan vs Canada

Chile vs Canada

Japan vs Great Britain

Chile vs Japan

Canada vs Great Britain

Discipline
Fair play points would have been used as a tiebreaker if the overall and head-to-head records of teams were tied. These were calculated based on yellow and red cards received in all group matches as follows:
first yellow card: minus 1 point;
indirect red card (second yellow card): minus 3 points;
direct red card: minus 4 points;
yellow card and direct red card: minus 5 points;

Only one of the above deductions is applied to a player in a single match.

References

External links
Women's Olympic Football Tournament Tokyo 2020, FIFA.com

Football at the 2020 Summer Olympics – Women's tournament
Great Britain at the 2020 Women's Olympic Football Tournament